In France, the Concours Général is the most prestigious academic competition held every year between students of Première (11th grade) and Terminale (12th and final grade) in almost all subjects taught in both general, technological and professional high schools. Exams usually take place in March, and their results are known in June or July. Students who show great ability in one field are selected to participate by their teachers and their school principal. Most of the time, no more than one student per high school is allowed to participate in the competition, which requires strong knowledge of college level topics (Some "elite" high schools sometimes depart from this rule, presenting dozens of students, such as the Lycée Louis-Le-Grand, or the Lycée Henri IV in Paris). In the humanities and social sciences, the exams involve one or more essays and last 6 hours. In the sciences, the exams last almost as long and are problem-based.

In a given subject, up to 18 awards can be given:
 up to 3 Prizes. A student winning a prize takes part in a ceremony held in the main amphitheatre of the Sorbonne University, where they are given the diploma and congratulated by the Minister of Education and members of the government.
 up to 5 Accessits
 up to 10 Regional awards

A student who wins any of the above is called a "lauréat du Concours Général". In Mathematics, the "Lauréat" is invited to a series of conferences at the Institute Poincaré and is usually selected to attend the Clay Institute summer school of science.

Current list of subjects 

Students of 11th grade only (all series):
 French
 History
 Geography
 Latin-French translation (version latine)
 French-Latin translation (thème latin)
 Greek-French translation (version grecque)

Students of both 11th and 12th grades:
 Plastic arts
 Music

Students of 12th grade (General High Schools):

In light of the Réforme des lycées, which went into effect with the class of 2021, students now participate in the Concours associated with one or both of their two specialized subjects. Philosophy is open to all, but is no longer separated into two exams for scientific and economic students, and literary students.

 Philosophy
 Mathematics 
 Physics and Chemistry 
 Biology and Geology 
 Engineering 
 Economics 
Language exams:
 Arabic
 Chinese (from 2007)
 English
 German
 Hebrew
 Italian
 Portuguese
 Spanish
 Russian

Students of technological and professional high schools usually attempt their main subject.

Alumni 
The Concours Général was created in 1744, so being a lauréat of the Concours général is a very prestigious award for any high school student. Many well-known French scientists, artists, literary figures and entrepreneurs have won the Concours Général in  one or even several subjects. Such names include: Anne Robert Jacques Turgot, Baron de Laune, Antoine Lavoisier, Camille Desmoulins, Augustin Louis Cauchy, Émile Littré, Charles Augustin Sainte-Beuve, Alfred de Musset, Urbain Le Verrier, Charles Baudelaire, Edmond de Goncourt, Marcelin Berthelot, Hippolyte Taine, Fustel de Coulanges, Émile Boutroux, Paul Bourget, Henri Poincaré, Jean Jaurès, Benoît Van Keer, Paul Painlevé, André Suarès, Léon Blum, Fernand Gregh, Charles Péguy, Jérome Carcopino, André Maurois, Maurice Couve de Murville, Edgar Faure, Maurice Schumann, Roger Nimier, Laurent Schwartz, Charles Alexandre de Calonne, Maximilien de Robespierre, André Chénier, Jules Michelet, Victor Hugo, Auguste Blanqui, Charles Forbes René de Montalembert, Évariste Galois, Henri d'Orléans, duc d'Aumale, Louis Pasteur, Edmond About, Lucien-Anatole Prévost-Paradol, Sadi Carnot, Émile Faguet, Jules Lemaitre, Henri Bergson, Alexandre Millerand, Émile Chartier (Alain), Maurice Denis, Édouard Herriot, Alfred Jarry, André Tardieu, Jean Giraudoux, Jules Romains, René Huyghe, Georges Pompidou, Antoine Blondin, Louis Néel, Valérie Mangin, Yves Meyer, Jean-Pierre Serre, Emmanuel Farhi.

See also 
International Science Olympiad

External links
 Alumni Association

Education in France